Boublil is a common Mizrahi Jewish surname. It may refer to:

Alain Boublil, (born 1941), French musical theatre lyricist and librettist
Alain Boublil (born 1947), discredited French commissioner and presidential aid
Daniel Boublil, French lyricist in musical comedies
Max Boublil (born 1979), French comedian, singer and film / TV actor
Shon Boublil (born 1993), Canadian guitarist